KXCD (93.5 FM) is a radio station licensed to serve the community of Fairfield, Idaho. The station is owned by Kim and Jami Lee's Lee Family Broadcasting Group, through licensee Lee Family Broadcasting, Inc. It airs an Regional Mexican format.

The station was assigned the call sign KXML by the Federal Communications Commission (FCC) on April 14, 2008. The station changed its call sign to KXCD on November 26, 2018.

KXCD has an outstanding construction permit with the FCC to increase its power from 200 to 40,000 watts and move its community of license from Salmon to Fairfield, Idaho, as a class C station.

The station became a simulcast of KXTA-FM's Regional Mexican format on December 13, 2022.

References

External links
Official Website
FCC Public Inspection File for KXCD

XCD
Radio stations established in 2008
2008 establishments in Idaho
Regional Mexican radio stations in the United States
Lemhi County, Idaho